Co-articulated consonants or complex consonants are consonants produced with two simultaneous places of articulation. They may be divided into two classes: doubly articulated consonants with two primary places of articulation of the same manner (both stop, or both nasal, etc.), and consonants with secondary articulation, that is, a second articulation not of the same manner.

Doubly articulated consonants
An example of a doubly articulated consonant is the voiceless labial-velar stop , which is pronounced simultaneously at the velum (a [k]) and at the lips (a [p]).  

In practically all languages of the world that have doubly articulated consonants, these are either clicks or labial-velars.

Consonants with secondary articulation
An example of a consonant with secondary articulation is the voiceless labialized velar stop  has only a single stop articulation, velar [k], with a simultaneous approximant-like rounding of the lips.

There is a large number of common secondary articulations. The most frequently encountered are labialization (such as ), palatalization (such as the Russian "soft" consonants like ), velarization (such as the English "dark" el ), and pharyngealization (such as the Arabic emphatic consonants like ).

Distinction between the two classes

Similar phones
The glottis controls phonation, and works simultaneously with many consonants.

See also
List of phonetics topics
Gemination